Anne Trister is a 1986 Canadian drama film directed by Léa Pool. It was entered into the 36th Berlin International Film Festival.

Synopsis 
A Swiss Jewish artist who is grieving her father, moves to Montreal and forms a friendship with a child psychiatrist. While creating an installation in an abandoned warehouse, she confronts her past and is increasingly drawn to her friend.

Cast

Awards

See also 

 List of LGBT-related films directed by women

References

External links

1986 films
1986 drama films
1986 LGBT-related films
Canadian drama films
Films directed by Léa Pool
Lesbian-related films
Canadian LGBT-related films
LGBT-related drama films
French-language Canadian films
1980s Canadian films